The canton of La Baule-Escoublac is an administrative division of the Loire-Atlantique department, western France. Its borders were modified at the French canton reorganisation which came into effect in March 2015. Its seat is in La Baule-Escoublac.

It consists of the following communes:
Batz-sur-Mer
La Baule-Escoublac
Le Croisic
Pornichet
Le Pouliguen
Saint-André-des-Eaux

References

Cantons of Loire-Atlantique